Euerythra virginea is a moth of the family Erebidae. It was described by Paul Dognin in 1924. It is found in Argentina.

References

 Natural History Museum Lepidoptera generic names catalog

Phaegopterina
Moths described in 1924